Troitskoye is a rural locality (a selo) in Partizansky Selsoviet, Meleuzovsky District, Bashkortostan, Russia. The population was 630 as of 2010. There are 6 streets.

Geography 
Troitskoye is located 15 km northwest of Meleuz (the district's administrative centre) by road. Romanovka is the nearest rural locality.

References 

Rural localities in Meleuzovsky District